The Range Servant Challenge by Hinton Golf was a golf tournament on the Challenge Tour. It was played in 2021 on the Rönnebäck course at Hinton Golf Club near Malmö, Sweden. It was the first of two Challenge Tour events held in Sweden in May 2021.

Craig Howie won the 2021 event, finishing 7 strokes ahead of the runner-up, Marcus Helligkilde.

Winner

References

External links
Coverage on the Challenge Tour's official site

Former Challenge Tour events
Golf tournaments in Sweden
Recurring sporting events established in 2021